The economy of Pakistan is classified as a low income developing economy. It is the 23rd-largest in terms of GDP based on purchasing power parity (PPP). In 2021, the country had a population of 227 million people. The country ranks poorly in most of development indicators set by UNDP and World Bank and has been left behind by most countries in South Asia over recent decades.

In the formative decades of Pakistan, the economy was largely based on private industries. Nationalisation of significant portion of the sector including financial services, manufacturing and transportation had begun in early 1970s. With the beginning of Zia-ul Haq's regime in 1980s, a more "Islamic" economy was adopted which outlawed economic practices forbidden in Sharīʿah and mandated traditional religious practices instead. Although, the economy began to privatise in 1990s.

Pakistan was classified as a semi-industrial economy for first time in late 1990s albeit an underdeveloped country with heavy dependence on agriculture, textile industry being dependent on cotton production. Primary export commodities include textiles, leather goods, sports equipment, chemicals, and carpets/rugs.

Pakistan is currently undergoing a process of economic liberalization, including the privatization of all government corporations, which is aimed at attracting foreign investment and decreasing budget deficits. However, the country continues to face the challenges of rapidly growing population, high illiteracy, corruption, political instability, a hostile neighborhood and heavy foreign debt.

Falling low on budgets for paying interest on its debt, Pakistan has been facing an economic crisis since 2022. Amid adverse effects of ongoing Russo-Ukrainian War, Pakistan has been facing shortage in supply and high inflation in prices of food, oil, gas and electricity. The crisis has led to sharp deappreciation of Pakistani ruppee and downgrading of country's credit ratings by various agencies which has further increased the possibility of default.

Economic history

1940s-50s
At Pakistan's inception in 1947, Pakistan was an agrarian economy. Agriculture contributed 53% GDP and 53.2% in 1949-50, employing 65% of Pakistani labour force, contributing to 99.2% of country's exports and earning 90% of foreign exchanges. Pakistan had a total population of 30 millions of which 6 millions lived in cities. It had a literacy rate of 10% and a poverty ratio of 55-60%. Both West and East Pakistan had immense amounts of minerals and natural resources, including natural gas, crude coil, coal, limestone and marble.

In 1950, Pakistan registered national and foreign savings rates of 2% each, and an investment rate of 4%. The manufacturing contributed 7.8% of GDP while other sectors contributed 39% of that. Trade balance in payments was 66 million ruppees deficit in 1949-50 which led Pakistan to adopt imports substituting industrialisation.

Data

Gross domestic product (GDP) 
The following table shows the main economic indicators from 1980 to 2022. Inflation below 5% is in green.

Stock market 

In the first four years of the twenty-first century, Pakistan's KSE 100 Index was the best-performing stock market index in the world as declared by the international magazine "Business Week".  The stock market capitalisation of listed companies in Pakistan was valued at $5,937 million in 2005 by the World Bank. But in 2008, after the General Elections, uncertain political environment, rising militancy along western borders of the country, and mounting inflation and current account deficits resulted in the steep decline of the Karachi Stock Exchange. As a result, the corporate sector of Pakistan has declined dramatically in recent times. However, the market bounced back strongly in 2009 and the trend continues in 2011. By 2014 the stock market burst into uncharted territories as the benchmark KSE 100 Index rose 907 points (3.1%) and shot past the 30,000-point barrier to close at a new record high, this came days after Moody's announced that it was upgrading the outlook of 5 major Pakistani banks from Negative to Stable, resulting in heavy buying in the banking sector. The rally was supported by heavy buying in the oil and gas and cement sectors. On 11 January 2016, aimed to help reduce market fragmentation and create a strong case for attracting strategic partnerships necessary for providing technological expertise all the three stock exchanges including Karachi Stock Exchange, Lahore Stock Exchange and Islamabad Stock Exchange were inducted into a unified Pakistan Stock Exchange.
In May 2017 American provider of stock market indexes and analysis tools, MSCI has confirmed that the Pakistan Stock Exchange (PSX) has been reclassified from Frontier Markets to Emerging Markets in its semi-annual index review. Euphoria over the stock exchange's reclassification as an emerging market propelled the PSE-100 Index past another milestone when the Index recorded an increase of 636.96 points, or 1.23%, to end at 52,387.87. In the fiscal year 2018, the stock market showed a negative growth of 7.1% over the last fiscal year and stood at 47000 points at average. Pakistan's stock market's performance has been remarkable in FY2021. During July 2020 to April 2021 period, the benchmark KSE-100 index improved from 34,889.41 points to 44262.35 points. Pakistan Stock exchange also successfully powered through initial COVID-19 induced economic downturn and earned the title of being the ‘best Asian stock market and fourth best-performing market across the world in 2020.’ The PSE-100 index continued to climb throughout the year. Nearly 40 percent growth in the PSE-100 Index in FY 2021 was driven by government's large stimulus package, central bank's stable policy rate, an uptick in large scale manufacturing, improvement in external accounts and reforms introduced by the Security and Exchange Commission of Pakistan (SECP) and PSX in the wake of COVID-19.

PSX 100 index growth rate

The sales of all companies (non-financial) surged to Rs 9,521 billion in the fiscal year 2021, posted a substantial increase of Rs 1,465 billion when compare to a decline of Rs 807 billion in preceding year. EBIT (earnings before interest and tax) recorded an increase of Rs 433 billion (53.21 percent YoY growth) during FY21, as the General, administrative & other expense witnessed relatively smaller rise in the same period. The interest expenses dropped to Rs 224 billion in FY21 from Rs 299 billion in FY20, resulted into a massive YoY increase of Rs 514 billion in profit before taxation. Besides, profit after tax of all companies rose by Rs 404 billion, posted a YoY growth of 125.06 percent during FY21 over FY20. Net profit margin of all companies jumped up to 7.64 in FY21 from 4.01 in FY20, primarily because of exceptional improvement in private sector companies’ net profit margin. Return on assets (ROA), and return on equity (ROE) of all companies rose to 6.37 percent and 17.93 percent in FY21 as compare to 3.10 percent and 8.91 percent in the preceding year. Private sector companies were the prime contributors in the improvement of ROA and ROE, the public sector companies contributed marginally. The key statistics of all public and private companies (non-finanical) listed at Pakistan Stock Exchange have been given in the following table;

Middle class 

, according to Wall Street Journal, citing estimates largely based on income and the purchase of consumption goods, had suggested that as many as 42% of Pakistan's population may now belong to the upper and middle classes. If these numbers are correct, or even indicative in any broad sense, then 87 million Pakistanis belong to the middle and upper classes, a population size which is larger than that of Germany. Official figures also show that the proportion of households that own a motorcycle and washing machines has grown impressively over the past 15 years. Furthermore, the IBA-SBP Consumer Confidence Index recorded its highest-ever level of 174.9 points in January 2017, showing an increase of 17 points from July 2016.

Separately, consumer financing recorded at Rs. 179 billion during the FY 2022. Auto finance continued to be the dominated segment, followed by House building which showed remarkable growth after the Mera Pakistan Mera Ghar scheme which was initiated by State Bank of Pakistan in December 2020. Under the scheme, 100 billion rupees have been disbursed by the banks until June 30, 2022. Total amount approved by banks reached to Rs. 236 billion while requested amount crossed half a tillion rupees.

Poverty alleviation expenditures 

Pakistan government spent over 1 trillion rupees (about $16.7 billion) on poverty alleviation programmes during the past four years, cutting poverty from 35% in 2000–01 to 29.3% in 2013 and 17% in 2015. Rural poverty remains a pressing issue, as development there has been far slower than in the major urban areas.

Employment 
The high population growth in the past few decades has ensured that a very large number of young people are now entering the labor market. Even though it is among the six most populous Asian nations. In the past, excessive red tape made firing from jobs, and consequently hiring, difficult. Significant progress in taxation and business reforms has ensured that many firms now are not compelled to operate in the underground economy.

Government revenues and expenditures 

Although the country is a Federation with constitutional division of taxation powers between the Federal Government and the four provinces, the revenue department of the Federal Government, the Federal Board of Revenue, collects more than 80% of the entire national tax collection.

Data is taken from Ministry of Finance.

Currency system

Rupee 
The basic unit of currency is the rupee, ISO code PKR and abbreviated Rs, which is divided into 100 paisas. Currently, 5,000 rupee note is the largest denomination in circulation. From 13 August 2005, the SBP started introducing its fifth generation design of banknotes with additional security features, with the Rs. 20 note being the first issuance. New designs of Rs. 5 (July 2008, later replaced by a coin) 10 (May 2006), Rs. 20 (March 2008, new color scheme), Rs. 50 (July 2008), Rs. 100 (November 2006), Rs. 500 (January 2010), Rs. 1000 (February 2007) and Rs. 5000 (May 2006) were gradually introduced.

The Pakistani rupee was pegged to the pound sterling until 1982, when the government of General Zia-ul-Haq, changed it to a managed float regime.  As a result, the rupee devalued by 38.5% between 1982/83 many of the industries built by his predecessor suffered with a huge surge in import costs. After years of appreciation under Zulfikar Ali Bhutto and despite huge increases in foreign aid, the rupee depreciated.

Foreign exchange rate 
The Pakistani rupee depreciated against the US dollar until around the start of the 21st century, when Pakistan's large current-account surplus pushed the value of the rupee up versus the dollar. Pakistan's central bank then stabilised by lowering interest rates and buying dollars, in order to preserve the country's export competitiveness.

Foreign exchange reserves 

Pakistan maintains foreign reserves with State Bank of Pakistan. The currency of the reserves was solely US dollar incurring speculated losses after the dollar prices fell during 2005, forcing the then Governor SBP Ishrat Hussain to step down. In the same year, the SBP issued an official statement proclaiming diversification of reserves in currencies including Euro and Yen, withholding ratio of diversification.

Following the international credit crisis and spikes in crude oil prices, Pakistan's economy could not withstand the pressure and on 11 October 2008, State Bank of Pakistan reported that the country's foreign exchange reserves had gone down by $571.9 million to $7749.7 million. The foreign exchange reserves had declined more by $10 billion to a level of $6.59 billion. In June 2013, Pakistan was on the brink of default on its financial commitments. The country's forex reserves were at a historic low covering only two weeks' worth of imports. In January 2020, Pakistan's Foreign exchange reserves stood at US$11.503 billion.

Structure of economy 

Agriculture accounted for about 53% of the GDP in 1947. While per-capita agricultural output has grown since then, it has been outpaced by the growth of the non-agricultural sectors, and the share of agriculture has dropped to roughly one-fifth of Pakistan's economy. In recent years, the country has seen rapid growth in industries (such as apparel, textiles, and cement) and services (such as telecommunications, transportation, advertising, and finance).

Major sectors

Agriculture 
Majority of the population, directly or indirectly, dependent on this sector. It contributes about 19.2% percent of gross domestic product (GDP) and accounts for 37.4% of employed labor force in 2021 and is the largest source of foreign exchange earnings. The most important crops are wheat, sugarcane, cotton, and rice, which together account for more than 75% of the value of total crop output. Pakistan's largest food crop is wheat. In 2017, Pakistan produced 26,674,000 tonnes of wheat, almost equal to all of Africa (27.1 million tonnes) and more than all of South America (25.9 million tonnes), according to the FAOSTAT. In the previous market year of 2018/19 Pakistan exported a record 4.5 million tonnes of rice as compared to around 4 MMT during the corresponding period in the previous year.

Pakistan is a net food exporter, except in occasional years when its harvest is adversely affected by droughts. Pakistan exports rice, cotton, fish, fruits (especially Oranges and Mangoes), and vegetables and imports vegetable oil, wheat, pulses and consumer foods. The economic importance of agriculture has declined since independence, when its share of GDP was around 53%. Following the poor harvest of 1993, the government introduced agriculture assistance policies, including increased support prices for many agricultural commodities and expanded availability of agricultural credit. From 1993 to 1997, real growth in the agricultural sector averaged 5.7% but has since declined to about 4%. Agricultural reforms, including increased wheat and oil seed production, play a central role in the government's economic reform package.

Data is from Ministry of Finance and Pakistan Bureau of Statistics.

* cotton production in million bales.

Pakistan's principal natural resources are arable land and water. About 25% of Pakistan's total land area is under cultivation and is watered by one of the largest irrigation systems in the world. Pakistan irrigates three times more acres than Russia. Pakistan agriculture also benefits from year round warmth. Zarai Taraqiati Bank Limited is the largest financial institution geared towards the development of agriculture sector through provision of financial services and technical expertise.

During 2017–18, agriculture sector recorded a remarkable growth of 3.88 percent and surpassed its targeted growth of 3.5 percent and last year's growth of 2.22 percent. All the major crops showed a positive trend in their production except wheat and maize. Sugarcane and rice production surpassed their historic level with 83.3 and 7.5 million tons respectively. Pakistan Bureau of Statistics provisionally valued this sector at Rs. 11,542,998 million for the year 2021 thus registering the growth of 20.1% over the last year. Again in 2018–19, Agriculture sector did not hit its target growth and only grew by 0.94%. Major crops except maize fell below their previous year output. The agriculture sector's performance during 2020-21 broadly stands encouraging as it grows by 3.48 percent against the target of 2.8 percent. The production of major crops such as wheat, sugarcane, maize and rice indicated considerable improvement compared to last year and surpassed the production targets. The production of sugarcane increased by 22.0 percent to 81.009 million tonnes from 66.380 million tonnes, rice by 13.6 percent to 8.419 million tonnes from 7.414 million tonnes and maize to 8.9 million tonnes from 7.883 million tonnes. However, the cotton crop suffered mainly due to decline in area sown, heavy monsoon rains and pest attacks. The cotton production reduced by 22.8 percent, to 7.064 million bales from 9.148 million bales last year.

Industry 

Pakistan's industrial sector accounts for approximately 19.12% of GDP. In 2021 it recorded a growth of 7.81% as compared to the growth of negative 5.75% in 2020. The government is privatizing large-scale industrial units, and the public sector accounts for a shrinking proportion of industrial output, while growth in overall industrial output (including the private sector) has accelerated. Government policies aim to diversify the country's industrial base and bolster export industries. Large Scale Manufacturing is the fastest-growing sector in Pakistani economy. Major Industries include textiles, fertiliser, cement, oil refineries, dairy products, food processing, beverages, construction materials, clothing, paper products and shrimp.

In Pakistan SMEs have a significant contribution in the total GDP of Pakistan, according to SMEDA and Economic survey reports, the share in the annual GDP is 40% likewise SMEs generating significant employment opportunities for skilled workers and entrepreneurs. Small and medium scale firms represent nearly 90% of all the enterprises in Pakistan and employ 80% of the non-agricultural labor force. These figures indicate the potential and further growth in this sector.

Data is from Pakistan Bureau of Statistics.

Manufacturing 
It is the largest of Pakistan's industrial sectors, accounting for approximately 12.13% of GDP. Manufacturing sub-sector is further divided in three components including large-scale manufacturing (LSM) with the share of 79.6% percent in manufacturing sector, small scale manufacturing share is 13.8 percent in manufacturing sector, while slaughtering contributes 6.5 percent in the manufacturing. Major sectors in industries include cement, fertiliser, edible oil, sugar, steel, tobacco, chemicals, machinery, food processing and medical instruments, primarily surgical. Pakistan is one of the largest manufacturers and exporters of surgical instruments.
Pakistan's largest corporations are mostly involved in utilities like oil, gas, electricity, automobile, cement, food, chemicals,  fertilizer, civil aviation, textile, and telecommunication.

Their assets, sales and profit/loss for year 2021 is listed below:

Cement Industry 
In 1947, Pakistan had inherited four cement plants with a total capacity of 0.5 million tons. Some expansion took place in 1956–66 but could not keep pace with the economic development and the country had to resort to imports of cement in 1976–77 and continued to do so until 1994–95. The cement sector consisting of 27 plants is contributing above Rs 30 billion to the national exchequer in the form of taxes. However, by 2013, Pakistan's cement is fast-growing mainly because of demand from Afghanistan and countries boosting real estate sector. The government has introduced an incentive package for the construction industry in April 2020, which stimulated the industry especially the private sector housing projects. Package included amnesty scheme, tax exemptions and Rs 36 billion subsidy for Naya Pakistan Housing Scheme. Further, banks were directed to increase construction sector loans to 5 percent of their total loan book and FED reduction on cement from Rs 2/kg to Rs 1.5/kg have given impetus to this industry.

Fertilizer industry 
Fertilizer is an important and costly input responsible for 30 to 50 percent increase in the crop productivity. The overall objective is sustainability and growth in agricultural sector that should match the growing population for food security and the promotion of economic growth. There are nine urea manufacturing plants, one DAP, three NP, four SSP, two CAN, one SOP and two plants of blended NPKs having a total production capacity of 9,172 thousand tonnes per annum in 2021. Urea is main fertilizer having 70 percent share in total production. Installed production capacity of 6,307 thousand tonnes per annum is enough to meet local demand subject to the availability of uninterrupted gas and RLNG supply.

Defence industry 

The defence industry of Pakistan, under the Ministry of Defence Production, was created in September 1951 to promote and coordinate the patchwork of military production facilities that have developed since independence. It is currently actively participating in many joint production projects such as Al Khalid 2 tank, advance trainer aircraft, combat aircraft, navy ships, and submarines. Pakistan is manufacturing and selling weapons to over 40 countries, bringing in $20 million annually. The country's arms imports increased by 119 percent between 2004–2008 and 2009–13, with China providing 54pc and the USA 27pc of Pakistan's imports.

Textiles industry 

Most of the Textile Industry is established in Punjab. Before 1990, the situation was different; most of the industry was in Karachi. Textile industry in Pakistan is traditional and conservative, producing and exporting most of low cost raw articles e.g. raw cotton, yarn, fabric etc. Share of finished goods and branded articles is nominal. Pakistan has a potential to quadruple its textile production and export, due to emerging Chinese markets and with its existing infrastructure. 2.7% of United States imports of clothing and other textiles is from Pakistan.

Textile is the most important manufacturing sector of Pakistan and has the longest production chain, with inherent potential for value addition at each stage of processing, from cotton to ginning, spinning, fabric, dyeing and finishing, made-ups and garments. This sector contributes nearly one-fourth of industrial value-added and provides employment to about 40 percent of industrial labor force. Barring seasonal and cyclical fluctuations, textiles products have maintained an average share of about 60 percent in national exports.

Automobile Industry 

The auto sector constitutes about 7 percent to LSM in 2021, which accounts for the significant industrial output of the country. According to PBS, automobile recorded 23.4 percent upsurge during July–March FY2021. In 2021, government has announced Pakistan's new Auto Policy 2021–2026. Given government support, removal of irritants is soon going to bear fruits in the wake of industrial expansion as many new investors have joined with commercial production while the existing players have already made huge investments and a lot more is in waiting. Among the automakers that are yet to start production, Proton, MG, and Volkswagen are the names that could make a significant impact in the local passenger vehicle market. Meanwhile, KIA, Hyundai, Changan, and Prince DFSK have already started productions in Pakistan.

Note: These figures do not include the production / sale of companies which are not members of Pakistan Automotive Manufacturers Association (PAMA).

After the entry of new models and brands by new entrants and due to the significant low benchmark interest rate of 7%, the consumer financing hit an all-time high in 2021. This trend started when a new Automotive Development Policy (2016-2021) was first approved by the ECC in its meeting held on March 18, 2016.

Such growth in demand for car financing was last seen during President Pervez Musharraf's regime (2001-2008) when banks, having ample liquidity, lent significant amount for cars without checking borrowers’ capabilities whether they were able to repay the debt. Later on, the car financing bubble busted when a large number of people defaulted on paying off the car financing.

Mining 

Pakistan is endowed with significant mineral resources and is emerging as a very promising area for prospecting/exploration for mineral deposits. Based on available information, the country's more than 6,00,000 km2 of outcrops area demonstrates varied geological potential for metallic and non-metallic mineral deposits. In the wake of 18th amendment to the constitution all the provinces are free to exploit and explore the mineral resources which are in their jurisdiction.
Mining and quarrying contributes 13.19% in industrial sector and its share in GDP is 2.4%.

In the recent past, exploration by government agencies as well as by multinational mining companies presents ample evidence of the occurrences of sizeable minerals deposits. Recent discoveries of a thick oxidised zone underlain by sulphide zones in the shield area of the Punjab province, covered by thick alluvial cover have opened new vistas for metallic minerals exploration. Pakistan has a large base for industrial minerals. The discovery of coal deposits having over 175 billion tonnes of reserves at Thar in the Sindh province has given an impetus to develop it as an alternative source of energy. There is vast potential for precious and dimension stones.

Extraction of principal minerals in the last 6 fiscal years is given in the table below :-

Energy 

Main sources of Pakistan primary energy supplies include Gas, Oil, Coal, imported LNG and Hydro electricity with the share of 33.1%, 22.6%, 18.3%, 10.3% and 9.9% respectively in 2020. Since the coal mining in Thar desert and the LNG imports from Qatar, Coal and imported LNG have increased their shares manyfold in just 5 years in primary energy supplies of country. The share of Gas is decreasing from 50% in 2005 to 33% in 2020 and oil since 2015 from 35% to 23% in 2020 and are replacing largely by Coal and LNG. As Pakistan intends to generate around 8,800 megawatts of nuclear power by 2030 and 40,000 megawatts by 2050, it's share is also increasing gradually.  

Central Power Purchasing Agency-Guarantee (CPPA-G) purchases electricity from power producers and the National Transmission and Despatch Company (NTDC) transmits this electricity via its transmission lines to Distribution Companies (DISCOs) which then distribute this electricity via their distribution lines to end consumers. For decades, the matter of balancing Pakistan's supply against the demand for electricity has remained a largely unresolved matter. Since 2018, the availability of electricity has improved with the substantial induction of generation capacity, but the cost of electricity has increased due to many factors like circular debt, fuel cost, currency devaluation, low recovery and Transmission and Distribution losses. Pakistan faces a significant challenge in revamping its network responsible for the supply of electricity.

Services 
Pakistan's service sector accounts for about 61.7% of GDP. Transport, storage, communications, finance, and insurance account for 24% of this sector, and wholesale and retail trade about 30%. Pakistan is trying to promote the information industry and other modern service industries through incentives such as long-term tax holidays.

Data is from Pakistan Bureau of Statistics.

Telecommunication 

After the deregulation of the telecommunication industry, the sector has seen an exponential growth. Pakistan Telecommunication Company Ltd has emerged as a successful Forbes 2000 conglomerate with over US$1 billion in sales in 2005. The mobile telephone market has exploded many-fold since 2003 to reach a subscriber base of 140 million users in July 2017, one of the highest mobile teledensities in the entire world. Pakistan won the prestigious Government Leadership award of GSM Association in 2006.

In Pakistan, the following are the top mobile phone operators:
 Jazz Pakistan (parent: VEON, Netherlands)
 Ufone (parent: PTCL (Etisalat), Pakistan/UAE)
 Telenor (parent: Telenor, Norway)
 Zong (parent: China Mobile, China)

By March 2009, Pakistan had 91 million mobile subscribers – 25 million more subscribers than reported in the same period in 2008. In addition to the 3.1 million fixed lines, while as many as 2.4 million are using Wireless Local Loop connections. Sony Ericsson, Nokia and Motorola along with Samsung and LG remain the most popular brands among customers.

Since liberalisation, over the past four years from 2003 to 2007 the Pakistani telecom sector has attracted more than $9 billion in foreign investments. During 2007–08, the Pakistani communication sector alone received $1.62 billion in Foreign Direct Investment (FDI) – about 30% of the country's total foreign direct investment.

According to the PC World, a total of 6.37 billion text messages were sent through Acision messaging systems across Asia Pacific over the 2008/2009 Christmas and New Year period. Pakistan was amongst the top five ranker with one of the highest SMS traffic with 763 million messages.
On 14 August 2010, Pakistan became the first country in the world to experience EVDO's RevB 3G technology that offers maximum speeds of 9.3 Mbit/s.

3G and 4G was simultaneously launched in Pakistan on 23 April 2014 through a SMRA auction. Three out of five companies got a 3G licence i.e. Ufone, Mobilink and Telenor while China Mobile's Zong got 3G as well as a 4G licence. Whereas fifth company, Warid Pakistan did not participate in the auction procedure, But they launched 4G LTE services on their existing 2G 1800 MHz spectrum due to Technology neutral terms and became world's first Telecom Company to transform directly from 2G to 4G. With that Pakistan joined the 3G and 4G world.
In December 2017, 3G and 4G subscribers in Pakistan reached to 46 millions.

After the successful implementation of Device Identification Registration and Blocking System (DIRBS) in 2019 along with comprehensive mobile manufacturing policy, created a favorable environment for mobile device manufacturing in Pakistan. For the first time in history of Pakistan, local mobile phone manufacturing exceeded the number of mobile phones that were imported in 2021. Mobile Device Manufacturing (MDM) licence have been issued to 26 companies including the world famous Samsung, Nokia, Oppo, TECNO, Infinix, Vgotel, Q-mobile etc.

Transportation

Air linkage 
The year 1955 marked the inauguration of the Pakistan airline's first scheduled international service – to the glittering, glitzy capital city of London, via Cairo and Rome. In 1959, the Government of Pakistan appointed Air Commodore Nur Khan as the managing director of PIA. With his visionary leadership, PIA ‘took off’ and within a short span of 6 years, gained the stature and status of one of the world's frontline carriers. In aviation circles, this period has often been referred to as the "golden years of PIA".On 29 April 1964, with a Boeing 720B, PIA earned the distinction of becoming the first airline from a non-communist country to fly into the People's Republic of China. Private sector airlines in Pakistan include Airblue, which serves the main cities within Pakistan in addition to destinations in the Persian Gulf and Manchester in the United Kingdom.

Railway Linkage 
Pakistan Railways (PR) is a major mode of transport in the public sector, contributing to the country's economic growth and providing national integration. The 13th of May, 1861 was a historical day when the first railway line was opened for public between Karachi City and Kotri, a distance of 169 Kms. In 1885, the Sindh, Punjab and Delhi Railways were purchased by the Secretary of State for India. On 1st January, 1886 this line and other State Railways were integrated and North Western State Railway was formed; which was later on renamed as North Western Railways (NWR). At the time of Independence, the NWR was bifurcated with 1,847 route miles lying in India and 5,048 route miles in Pakistan. Now in 2021, Pakistan Railways comprises a total of 467 locomotives (462 Diesel Engine and 05 Steam Engines) for the 7,791 km route length. Pakistan Railways is a two-gauge system i.e., broad-gauge and meter-gauge. Out of total 7791 km of route, 7479 km is broad-guage while the remaining 312 km is meter-guage. Pakistan Railways employs 63,000 people in the year 2021.

Road Linkage 
The National Highway Authority (NHA) was created, in 1991, through an Act of the Parliament, for planning, development, operation, repair and maintenance of National Highways and Strategic Roads specially entrusted to NHA by the Federal Government or by a Provincial Government or other authority concerned. NHA is custodian of 39 national highways/ motorways/ expressway/ strategic routes having a total length of 12,131 km. It is 4.6% of total national roads network i.e. 263,775 km, however, it carries 80% of commercial traffic and N-5 which is blood-line of Pakistan, carries 65% of this load in the country.

Maritime Linkage 
Pakistan National Shipping Corporation (PNSC) is a National flag carrier. It came into existence by a merger of National Shipping Corporation (NSC) and Pakistan Shipping Corporation in 1979. PNSC has worldwide operations in the Dry Bulk segment of shipping market since incorporation and is involved in transportation of liquid cargo since 1998 locally and internationally. The corporation's head office is located in Karachi. At present, PNSC fleet comprises 11 vessels of various types/sizes (05 Bulk carriers,04 Aframax tankers and 02 LR-1 Clean Product tankers) with a total deadweight capacity (cargo carrying capacity) of 831,711 metric tons, the highest ever carrying capacity since inception of PNSC.

Finance 

Pakistan has a large and diverse banking system. In 1974, a nationalization program led to the creation of six government-owned banks.  A privatization program in the 1990s led to the entry of foreign-owned and local banks into the industry.  As of 2010, there were five public-owned commercial banks in Pakistan, as well as 25 domestic private banks, six multi-national banks and four specialized banks.

Since 2000 Pakistani banks have begun aggressive marketing of consumer finance to the emerging middle class, allowing for a consumption boom (more than a 7-month waiting list for certain car models) as well as a construction bonanza. Pakistan's banking sector remained remarkably strong and resilient during the world financial crisis in 2008–09, a feature which has served to attract a substantial amount of FDI in the sector. Stress tests conducted in June 2008 data indicate that the large banks are relatively robust, with the medium and small-sized banks positioning themselves in niche markets.

The Pakistan Bureau of Statistics provisionally valued this sector at Rs.807,807 million in 2012 thus registering over 510% growth since 2000.

An article published in Journal of the Asia Pacific Economy by Mete Feridun of University of Greenwich in London with his Pakistani colleague Abdul Jalil presents strong econometric evidence that financial development fosters economic growth in Pakistan.

In recent years, banking through digital channels has been gaining popularity in the country. These channels offer alternatives resulting in faster delivery of financial services to a wide range of customers. Significant progress has been observed in the usage of Internet Banking and Mobile Banking channels during the last few years, which is evident from the fact that in the last 5 year, the internet banking transactions have seen compound annualized growth of 31%, whereas mobile banking transactions have grown by 86% during the said period.. New regulations such as regulations for Electronic Money Institutions (EMIs), Security of Digital Payments, Payment Card Security Regulations, Internet Banking Security Regulations, and Guidelines for White Labels ATMs have been issued by SBP in recent years. These steps have been taken with the motivation to bring in innovation in Payments systems with an adequate balance of security and providing a level playing field to all the stakeholders.

Housing 

The property sector has expanded twenty-threefold since 2001, particularly in metropolises like Lahore. Nevertheless, the Karachi Chamber of Commerce and Industry estimated in late 2006 that the overall production of housing units in Pakistan has to be increased to 0.5 million units annually to address 6.1 million backlog of housing in Pakistan for meeting the housing shortfall in next 20 years. The report noted that the present housing stock is also rapidly aging and an estimate suggests that more than 50% of stock is over 50 years old. It is also estimated that 50% of the urban population now lives in slums and squatter settlements. The report said that meeting the backlog in housing, besides replacement of out-lived housing units, is beyond the financial resources of the government. This necessitates putting in place a framework to facilitate financing in the formal private sector and mobilise non-government resources for a market-based housing finance system. To promote affordable housing and home ownership among low to middle-income group, who currently do not own a house, SBP in 2020 has introduced Government's Mark-Up Subsidy Scheme through which subsidized financing is provided to individuals for construction or purchase of a new house. Since then huge demand for house financing has been witnessed by the commercial banks.

Tourism 

Tourism in Pakistan has been stated as being the tourism industry's "next big thing". Pakistan, with its diverse cultures, people and landscapes, has attracted 90 million tourists to the country, almost double to that of a decade ago. Currently, Pakistan ranks 130th in the world by tourist income. Due to threat of terrorism the number of foreigner tourists has gradually declined and the shock of 2013 Nanga Parbat tourist shooting has terribly adversely effected the tourism industry. , tourism has begun to recover in Pakistan, albeit gradually, with a current global rank of 130.

Foreign trade, remittances, aid, and investment

Investment 
Foreign investment had significantly declined by 2010, dropping by 54.6% due to Pakistan's political instability and weak law and order, according to the Bank of Pakistan.

Business regulations have been overhauled along liberal lines, especially since 1999. Most barriers to the flow of capital and international direct investment have been removed. Foreign investors do not face any restrictions on the inflow of capital, and investment of up to 100% of equity participation is allowed in most sectors. Unlimited remittance of profits, dividends, service fees or capital is now the rule. However, doing business has been becoming increasingly difficult over the past decade due to political instability, rising domestic insurgency and insecurity and vehement corruption. This can be confirmed by the World Bank's Ease of Doing Business Index report degrading its ratings for Pakistan each year since September 2009.

The World Bank (WB) and International Finance Corporation's flagship report Ease of Doing Business Index 2020 ranked Pakistan 108 among 190 countries around the globe, indicating a continuous improvement and taking a jump from 136 last year. The top five countries were New Zealand, Singapore, Denmark, Hong Kong and South Korea.

With improvement in ease of doing business ranking and giving an investment friendly road map from government, many new auto sector giants like France's Renault, South Korean's Hyundai and Kia,  Chinese JW Forland and German auto giant Volkswagen are considering entry in Pakistan auto market through joint ventures with local manufacturers like Dewan Farooque Motors, Khalid Mushtaq Motors and United Motors. As of March 2022, only the Hyundai Nishat JV materialised.

US oil and gas giant Exxon Mobil has again returned to Pakistan after nearly three decades gap and has acquired 25% shares in offshore drilling in May 2018, with initial survey showing a potential of huge hydrocarbon reserves discovery at offshore.

To boost Pakistan's unstable foreign-exchange reserves, Qatar announced to invest $3 billion the form of deposits and direct investments in the country. By the end of June 2019, Qatar sent the first $500 million to Pakistan.

Data is from SBP.

Foreign acquisitions and mergers 
With the rapid growth in Pakistan's economy, foreign investors are taking a keen interest in the corporate sector of Pakistan. In recent years, majority stakes in many corporations have been acquired by multinational groups.

 PICIC by Singapore-based Temasek Holdings for $339 million
 Union Bank by Standard Chartered Bank for $487 million
 Prime Commercial Bank by ABN Amro for $228 million
 PakTel by China Mobile for $460 million
 PTCL by Etisalat for $1.8 billion
 Additional 57.6% shares of Lakson Tobacco Company acquired by Philip Morris International for $382 million
 In 2016, Arçelik acquired Dawlance for $243 million.
 In 2016, FrieslandCampina acquired 51% stake in Engro Foods for $446.81 million.
 In 2016, The Abraaj Group sold its 66.4% stake in K-Electric to Shanghai Electric for $1.77 billion.

The foreign exchange receipts from these sales are also helping cover the current account deficit.

Foreign trade 

Pakistan witnessed the highest export of US$25.4 billion in the FY 2010–11. However, in subsequent years exports have declined considerably. This declined started from financial year 2014–15 when an international commodity slump set in. This was compounded by structural supply side constraints including energy shortages, high input costs and an overvalued exchange rate. From financial year 2014 to 2016, exports declined by 12.4 percent. Exports growth trend over this period was similar to the world trade growth patterns. Pakistan's external sector continued facing stress during 2016–17. But still Pakistan's merchandise trade exports grew by 0.1 percent during the fiscal year 2016–17. The imports continued to grow at a much faster rate and grew by a large percentage of 18.0 during the FY 2017 as compared to the previous year.
World imports had been stagnant between 2011 and 2014 but registered significant drop since early 2015 because of weak commodity and product prices and weak global economic activity. Economic growth was lacklustre in the OECD
countries which contributed to the slowdown in China. Furthermore, the ratio between real growth in world imports and world real GDP growth substantially declined. This decline in the import content of economic activity triggered a shift in consumption worldwide from traded towards non-traded goods, import substitution, a slowdown in the pace of trade liberalization, and gave currency to protectionist measures. A bulk of Pakistan's exports are directed to the OECD region and China. Historical data suggest strong correlation between Pakistani exports to imports in OECD and China. As per FY 2016 data, more than half of country's exports are shipped to these two destinations i.e. OECD and China. A decline in Pakistan overall exports, thus occurred in this backdrop.

Note: This is the trade data (export and import) as released by the SBP. This may differ from the data compiled by Pakistan Bureau of Statistics.

Pakistan's imports are showing rising trend at a relatively faster rate due to the increased economic activity as part of China Pakistan Economic Corridor (CPEC), particularly in the Energy sector. The construction projects under CPEC require heavy machinery that has to be imported. It is also observed that the economy is currently being led both by investments as well as consumption, resulting in relatively higher levels of imports. During FY 2018 Pakistan's exports picked up and reached to US$24.8 billion showing a growth of 12.6 percent over previous year FY 2017. Imports on the other hand also increased by 16.2 percent and touched the highest figure of US$56.6 billion. As a result, the trade deficit widened to US$31.8 billion which was the highest since last ten years. Pakistan's exports of goods recorded their highest level of $25.6 billion during the fiscal year 2020–21, higher than the $25.3 billion recorded in 2010–11.

Exports 
Pakistan's major export commodities since fiscal year 2014 are listed in the table below.

Imports 
Pakistan's major import commodities since fiscal year 2014 are listed in the table below.

External imbalances 

During FY 2017, the increase in imports of capital equipment and fuel significantly put pressure on the external account. A reversal in global oil prices led to
increase in POL imports, accompanied by falling exports, as a result the merchandised trade deficit grew by 39.4 percent to US$26.885 billion in FY 2017. While remittances and Coalition Support Fund inflows both declined slightly over the same period last year, however, the impact was offset by an improvement in the income account, mainly due to lower profit repatriations by oil and gas firms.

'The current account deficit increased to US$19.2 billion in FY 2018.

However, the impact of high current deficit on foreign exchange reserves was not severe, as financial inflows were available to the country to partially offset the gap; these inflows helped ensure stability in the exchange rate. Net FDI grew by 12.4 percent and reached US$1.6 billion in the nine-months period, whereas net FPI saw an inflow of US$631 million, against an outflow of US$393 million last year. Encouragingly for the country, the period saw the completion of multiple merger and acquisition deals between local and foreign companies. Moreover, multiple foreign automakers announced their intention to enter the Pakistani market, and some also entered into joint ventures with local conglomerates. This indicates that Pakistan is clearly on foreign investors' radar, and provides a positive outlook for FDI inflows going forward. government's successful issuance of a US$1.0 billion Sukuk in the international capital market, at an extremely low rate of 5.5 percent.
Besides, Pakistan continued to enjoy support from international financial institutions (IFIs) like the World Bank and Asian Development Bank, and from bilateral partners like China, in the post-EFF period: net official loan inflows of US$1.1 billion were recorded during the period. As a result, the country's FX reserve amounted to US$20.8 billion by 4 May 2017 sufficient to finance around four month of import payments.

Economic aid 

Pakistan receives economic aid from several sources as loans and grants. The International Monetary Fund (IMF), World Bank (WB), Asian Development Bank (ADB), etc. provide long-term loans to Pakistan. Pakistan also receives bilateral aid from developed and oil-rich countries. Foreign aid has been one of the main sources of money for the Pakistani economy. Collection of foreign aid has been one of the priorities of almost every Pakistani Government with the Prime Minister himself leading delegations on a regular basis to collect foreign aid.

The Asian Development Bank will provide close to $6 billion development assistance to Pakistan during 2006–9. The World Bank unveiled a lending programme of up to $6.5 billion for Pakistan under a new four-year, 2006–2009, aid strategy showing a significant increase in funding aimed largely at beefing up the country's infrastructure. Japan will provide $500 million annual economic aid to Pakistan. In November 2008, the International Monetary Fund (IMF) has approved a loan of 7.6 billion to Pakistan, to help stabilise and rebuild the country's economy. Between the 2008 and 2010 fiscal years, the IMF extended loans to Pakistan totalling 5.2 billion dollars. The government decided in 2011 to cut off ties with the IMF. However the government newly elected in 2013 re-established these ties, and a negotiated a three-year $6.6 billion package which would allow it to deal with on-going debt issues. In May 2019, Pakistan finalised a US$6 billion foreign aid with IMF. This is Pakistan's 22nd such bailout from the IMF.

The China–Pakistan Economic Corridor is being developed with a contribution of mainly concessionary loans from China under the Belt and Road Initiative. Much like BRI, value of CPEC investments transcends any fiat currency and is only estimated vaguely as it spans over decades of past and future industrial development and global economic influence.

Remittances 
The remittances of Pakistanis living abroad has played important role in Pakistan's economy and foreign exchange reserves. The Pakistanis settled in Western Europe and North America are important sources of remittances to Pakistan. Since 1973 the Pakistani workers in the oil rich Arab states have been sources of billions of dollars of remittances.

The 9 million-strong Pakistani diaspora, contributed US$19.3 billion to the economy in FY2017. The major source countries of remittances to Pakistan include UAE, US, Saudi Arabia, GCC countries (including Bahrain, Kuwait, Qatar and Oman), Australia, Canada, Japan, Norway,  Switzerland, UK and EU countries.

Remittances sent home by overseas Pakistani workers have seen a negative growth of 3.0% in the fiscal year 2017 compare to previous year when remittances reached at all-time high of 19.9 billion US dollars. This decline in remittances is mainly due to the adverse economic conditions of Arabian and gulf countries after the fall in oil prices in 2016. However, the recent development activities in the Qatar FIFA World Cup, Dubai Expo, Saudi Arabia's implementation of its Vision 2030 and particularly the recent visit of the P.M to Kuwait should all be helpful in opening new avenues for employment in these countries. Going forward one can expect improvements in the coming years. The SBP's data showed that remittances amounted to $29.4 billion for the year 2021. The government and SBP took measures to incentivise the use of formal channels of sending money home. The orderly foreign exchange market conditions also contributed to the rise in the remittances. Remittances helped improve the country's external sector position despite the challenging global economic conditions due to corona virus pandemic.

Data is taken from SBP and Ministry of Finance.

Remittances sent home by overseas Pakistanis in the fiscal year 2020/21 are as under:

Economic issues

2022 Pakistan economic crisis

Corruption 

The corruption is on-going issue in the government, claiming to take initiatives against it, particularly in the government and lower levels of police forces. In 2011, the country has had a consistently poor ranking at the Transparency International's Corruption Perceptions Index with scores of 2.5, 2.3 in 2010, and 2.5 in 2009 out of 10. In 2011, Pakistan ranked 134 on the index with 42 countries ranking worse.
In 2012, Pakistan's ranking dropped even further from 134 to 139, making Pakistan the 34th most corrupt country in the world, tied with Azerbaijan, Kenya, Nepal, and Nigeria.
However, during Sharif regime (2013–17), Pakistan got improved ranking of 117/180 in 2017 (with an improvement in score 28, 29, 30, 32, 32 [2013–17]), equal to Egypt (better than 59 countries). Due to bad effects of corruption on country, National Accountability Bureau (NAB) was established in 1999. The basic purpose of NAB was to recover looted money from corrupt elements and deposit in the national exchequer. NAB during 2018 to 2020 has recovered Rs 502 billion from corrupt elements which is a record achievement. NAB has recovered Rs 814 billion directly or indirectly from corrupt elements since the bureau's inception, which is more recovery as compared to other such anti corruption organizations.

Debt

As per the CIA World Factbook, in 2017, Pakistan ranked 57th in the world, with respect to the public external debt to various international monetary authorities (owing ~$107.527 billion in 2019), with a total of 67.1% of GDP (in 2017).

Government debt and liabilities:
 Total debt & liabilities = Gross Public Debt + External Liabilities + Private Sector External Debt + PSEs External Debt + PSEs Domestic Debt + Commodity Operations + Intercompany External Debt from Direct Investor abroad
 Gross Public Debt = Government (Federal+Provincial) Domestic Debt + Government (Federal+Provincial) External Debt + Debt from IMF
 Total Debt of Government / Net Public Debt = Gross Public Debt – Government Deposits in the Banking System.
 Public External Debt = Government External Debt + Debt from IMF (Foreign Exchange Liabilities are not included)
 Total External Debt = Public External Debt + Public Sector Enterprises + Banks + Private Sector +  Debt Liabilities to Direct Investors
Data is taken from the State Bank of Pakistan.

Pakistan external debt servicing (principal + interest)

See also 

Economy of Azad Kashmir
Economy of Balochistan, Pakistan
Economy of Gilgit Baltistan
Economy of Khyber Pakhtunkhwa
Economy of Punjab, Pakistan
Economy of Sindh
Economy of Karachi
Economy of Islamabad
Economy of Lahore
Economy of Faisalabad
Economy of Rawalpindi

Notes

References

Further reading 
 
 
 Ahmad, Viqar and Rashid Amjad. 1986. The Management of Pakistan's Economy, 1947–82. Karachi: Oxford University Press.
 Ali, Imran. 1997. ‘Telecommunications Development in Pakistan’, in E.M. Noam (ed.), Telecommunications in Western Asia and the Middle East. New York: Oxford University Press.
 Ali, Imran. 2001a. ‘The Historical Lineages of Poverty and Exclusion in Pakistan’. Paper presented at Conference on Realm, Society and Nation in South Asia. National University of Singapore.
 Ali, Imran. 2001b. ‘Business and Power in Pakistan’, in A.M. Weiss and S.Z. Gilani (eds), Power and Civil Society in Pakistan. Karachi: Oxford University Press.
 Ali, Imran. 2002. ‘Past and Present: The Making of the State in Pakistan’, in Imran Ali, S. Mumtaz and J.L. Racine (eds), Pakistan: The Contours of State and Society. Karachi: Oxford University Press.
 Ali, Imran, A. Hussain. 2002. Pakistan National Human Development Report. Islamabad: UNDP.
 Ali, Imran, S. Mumtaz and J.L. Racine (eds). 2002. Pakistan: The Contours of State and Society. Karachi: Oxford University Press.
 Amjad, Rashid. 1982. Private Industrial Investment in Pakistan, 1960–70. London: Cambridge University Press.
 Andrus, J.R. and A.F. Mohammed. 1958. The Economy of Pakistan. Stanford: Stanford University Press.
 Bahl, R., & Cyan, M. (2009). Local Government Taxation in Pakistan (No. paper0909). International Center for Public Policy, Andrew Young School of Policy Studies, Georgia State University.
 Barrier, N.G. 1966. The Punjab Alienation of Land Bill of 1900. Durham, NC: Duke University South Asia Series.
 Jahan, Rounaq. 1972. Pakistan: Failure in National Integration. New York: Columbia University Press.
 Kessinger, T.G. 1974. Vilyatpur, 1848–1968. Berkeley and Los Angeles: University of California Press.
 Kochanek, S.A. 1983. Interest Groups and Development: Business and Politics in Pakistan. New Delhi: Oxford University Press.
 LaPorte, Jr, Robert and M.B. Ahmad. 1989. Public Enterprises in Pakistan. Boulder, Colorado: Westview Press.
 Latif, S.M. 1892. Lahore. Lahore: New Imperial Press, reprinted 1981, Lahore: Sandhu Printers.
 Low, D.A. (ed.). 1991. The Political Inheritance of Pakistan. London: Macmillan.
 Noman, Omar. 1988. The Political Economy of Pakistan. London: KPI.
 Papanek, G.F. 1967. Pakistan's Development: Social Goals and Private Incentives. Cambridge, Massachusetts: Harvard University Press.
 Raychaudhuri, Tapan and Irfan Habib (eds). 1982. The Cambridge Economic History of India, 2 vols. Cambridge: Cambridge University Press
 White, L.J. 1974. Industrial Concentration and Economic Power. Princeton, N.J.: Princeton University Press.
 Ziring, Lawrence. 1980. Pakistan: The Enigma of Political Development. Boulder, Colorado: Folkestone.
 Ali, Imran. 1987. ‘Malign Growth? Agricultural Colonisation and the Roots of Backwardness in the Punjab’, Past and Present, 114
 Ali, Imran. August 2002. ‘The Historical Lineages of Poverty and Exclusion in Pakistan’, South Asia, XXV(2).
 Ali, Imran and S. Mumtaz. 2002. ‘Understanding Pakistan—The Impact of Global, Regional, National and Local Interactions’, in Imran Ali, S. Mumtaz and J.L. Racine (eds), Pakistan: the Contours of State and Society. Karachi: Oxford University Press.
 Hasan, Parvez. 1998. Pakistan's Economy at the Crossroads: Past Policies and Present Imperatives. Karachi: Oxford University Press.
 Hussain, Ishrat. 1999. Pakistan: The Economy of an Elitist State. Karachi: Oxford University Press.
 Khan, Shahrukh Rafi. 1999. Fifty Years of Pakistan's Economy: Traditional Topics and Contemporary Concerns. Karachi: Oxford University Press.
 Kibria, Ghulam. 1999. Shattered Dream: Understanding Pakistan's Development. Karachi: Oxford University Press.
 Kukreja, Veena. 2003. Contemporary Pakistan: Political Processes, Conflicts and Crises. New Delhi: Sage Publications.
 Zaidi, S. Akbar. 1999. Issues in Pakistan's Economy. Karachi: Oxford University Press
 Faheem, Khan. 2010. Issues in Pakistan's Economy. Peshawar:
 https://www.thenews.com.pk/tns/detail/710478-retail-sector-a-5-billion-tax-potential:

 External links 

 Statistics Division, Government of Pakistan
 Ministry of Finance, Government of Pakistan
 Ministry of Commerce, Government of Pakistan
 World Bank Summary Trade Statistics Pakistan
 Pakistan. The World Factbook''. Central Intelligence Agency.

 
Pakistan